Susan Golden (née Stephens) is a Professor of molecular biology known for her research in circadian rhythms. She is currently a faculty member at UC San Diego.

Golden was born in Pine Bluff, Arkansas in 1957. She attended the local public high school, where she was involved with the marching band and school newspaper. She was accepted to the Mississippi University for Women in 1976 as a journalism major, but soon switched her studies to major in biology and minor in chemistry.

Golden graduated from MUW in two years, after which she was offered a position in the first cohort of trainees in a NIH-financed doctoral program in genetics at the University of Missouri. During her graduate program, Golden met James Golden, a fellow doctoral student. They later married in 1979. At the University of Missouri, Golden researched the protein makeup of the photosynthetic center in cyanobacteria, work she continued when she moved to the University of Chicago in 1983 as a postdoctoral research fellow.

In 1986 Golden accepted a faculty position at Texas A&M to further her investigation into light-dependent gene regulation in bacteria. While at Texas A&M, Golden became interested in studying circadian rhythms after her first encounter with Carl H. Johnson and Takao Kondo, with whom she would go on to discover the Kai complex. Golden was promoted to Distinguished Professor at Texas A&M in 2003, and then moved to UC San Diego in 2008 where she is currently a Distinguished Professor and the Director of the Center for Circadian Biology.

Research contributions

Early work 
Golden began her graduate career with Louis A. Sherman, where she used genetics to research the proteins in photosynthetic complexes of the cyanobacteria Synechoccus elongatus. Golden was the first to demonstrate that a mutant allele of the psbA gene is sufficient to confer herbicide resistance in cyanobacteria. Other research later confirmed that this gene coded for a protein integral to the Photosystem II complex involved in photosynthesis. These findings also demonstrated that genetic manipulation of cyanobacteria was relatively simple, opening up S. elongatus as a model organism for future genetic experiments. During her postdoctoral research at the University of Chicago, in the lab of Robert Haselkorn, Golden continued to work on developing genetic manipulation techniques for Synechoccus elongatus in order to elucidate mechanisms of gene regulation in photosynthesis genes. In 1989, Golden's team discovered that the specific psbA allele expressed by cyanobacteria depended on the lighting conditions in which the colony was grown. This finding led her to investigate more generally how light influences expression of photosynthetic genes in the organism and contributes to the overall understanding of bacterial responses to environmental input. This line of inquiry necessitated the development of a technique for visualizing changes in gene expression in living organisms. During her time as a professor at the Texas A&M, Golden attempted to solve this problem by attaching a luciferase gene to the promoters of the cyanobacterial genes of interest and viewing the colonies with a night vision scope. The approach was a success, allowing for quantification of cyanobacterial gene expression in vivo over an extended time period. This technique drew the interest of chronobiologist Carl H. Johnson, with whom Golden would go on to collaborate and eventually discover the KaiABC complex .

Discovery of kai complex 
Golden studies the endogenous rhythms of cyanobacteria, a group of photosynthetic bacteria known to have circadian clocks. She transformed Synechococcus elongatus, one of the better studied cyanobacteria species, with a luciferase reporter gene and showed circadian rhythm in bioluminescence. This reporter system was used to discover three key proteins related to the cyanobacterial clock: KaiA, KaiB, and KaiC. In collaboration with Carl H. Johnson and Takao Kondo, she demonstrated and described the molecular mechanism regulating circadian rhythms in S. elongatus PCC 7942, the only model organism for a prokaryotic circadian clock. Susan Golden identified genes in the S. elongatus genome that contribute to circadian rhythm through mutational screens using transposons to disrupt genes and their function. In one mutation screen study, nineteen mutations were identified and mapped to the three kai genes; Inactivation of any single kai gene reduced kaiBC-promoter activity and abolished the circadian rhythm of expression of KaiA and KaiB.

The kai protein circadian system
S. elongatus has a circadian clock with an oscillator based only on three proteins: KaiA, KaiB, and KaiC. Circadium rhythm is generated based on KaiC phosphorylation and dephosphorylation. Light transmits energy and information to the cyanobacteria, affecting transcriptional regulation of the circadium clock. This 24-hour rhythm can be recreated in vitro with the addition of ATP. The ratio of ATP/ADP fluctuates during the course of the day, and is sensed by KaiC, which phosphorylates or de-phosphorylates based on this signal. This Kai protein system is the simplest post-translational oscillator known so far.

In photosynthesizing cyanobacteria, the circadian clock is driven by light and reset by darkness. When Golden mutated the gene cikA, the clock was functional but could not be reset, resulting in the bacterial equivalent of permanent jet lag. CikA protein contains a domain that is structurally similar to KaiA, which was also found to be important in resetting the clock. CikA and KaiA bind to quinones, which carry electrons in the electron transport chain of photosynthesis. Quinones are oxidized in the dark and reduced in the light, and the redox state affects KaiA activity. When quinones are oxidized, KaiA separates from KaiC and binds to them, resetting the clock. Therefore, quinones are essential in transmitting light information to KaiC.

Current research

Metabolic engineering
After moving to UC San Diego in 2008, Susan Golden's research converged with that of her husband, James Golden, to investigate biofuels. She currently researches the potential of utilizing cyanobacteria for industrial production of biofuels. Cyanobacteria are attractive due to simplistic genomes and ability to be genetically modified for industrial efficiency. Their photosynthetic nature may ideally be used to produce sustainably produce biofuels, potentially replacing the need for petroleum and other fossil fuels. They have simple requirements for growth, only requiring sunlight, water, and inorganic trace elements for fast growth. Cyanobacteria are capable of fixing atmospheric carbon (carbon dioxide) into bio-oils and biofuels.

In 2016, Golden and colleagues manually curated a model of metabolism in S. elongatus, indicating the importance of a linear tricarboxylic acid cycle (TCA) metabolic pathway and potential modifications for bio-industrial application.

Honors, awards, and membership
 National Science Foundation Presidential Young Investigator Award, 1989 - 1995
 Fellow of the American Academy of Microbiology, elected in 2000
 Texas A&M Distinguished Professor, 2003
 Member of the Faculty of 1000 Biology, 2008 - 2015
 UC San Diego Distinguished Professor and Chancellor’s Associates Chair in Molecular Biology, 2008 - present
 Member of the National Academy of Sciences, elected in 2010
 Howard Hughes Medical Institute Professor, 2014 - present
 Aschoff and Honma Prize for Biological Rhythm Research, 2018

Selected publications

References

Living people
Chronobiologists
Members of the United States National Academy of Sciences
Year of birth missing (living people)

Molecular biologists
American biologists